The Phi Gamma Delta Fraternity House in Minneapolis, Minnesota is the University of Minnesota chapter house of Phi Gamma Delta.  The house, located just across University Avenue from the East Bank Campus, is listed on the National Register of Historic Places for its distinctive architecture, as well as its role in the development of fraternity housing in Minnesota.

The house is a unique example of the Vienna Secession movement, making it unusual during a time when other fraternity houses were being designed with Classical Revival and other period revival architectural styles.  The architect, Carl Stravs, used Vienna Secession features such as the overhanging roof slab with a rounded edge, pentagonal window openings on the ground floor, and decorations integrated with the main concrete structure.  The living room on the first floor has a stone fireplace on the west wall, which Stravs called, "the center of all the social life in the fraternity house".  The fireplace is built in rusticated limestone said to be salvaged from the University's Old Main building, which was destroyed by a fire in 1904.  The wall has niches housing the busts of Greek philosophers, which were also reportedly salvaged from Old Main.

Stravs used reinforced concrete to provide fireproof construction. He also did this in accordance with his design principle for the building, which was, "to provide the most economical, simple and substantial rooming for the use of the junior members of the fraternity, with the least amount of space wasted." The second and third floors each contained five bedrooms, with shared bathroom facilities.

The Phi Gamma Delta chapter house, like many other fraternities adjacent to the U of M campus, is part of a "fraternity row" along University Avenue, and was part of a first wave of fraternity house construction between 1900 and 1917.  Most of these houses featured prominent entries, with a porch or terrace, and had large living rooms and chapter meeting rooms on the first floor.  Individual students usually had rooms on the second and third floors of these houses.  The Phi Gamma Delta chapter house, besides being listed on the National Register, is part of the Minneapolis Heritage Preservation Commission's University of Minnesota Greek Letter Chapter House Historic District.

See also
The List of Fraternities and Sororities at the University of Minnesota for further information on Phi Gamma Delta's historical building, and other iconic styles represented on the University of Minnesota campus.

References

1912 establishments in Minnesota
Fraternity and sorority houses
National Register of Historic Places in Minneapolis
Houses completed in 1912
Phi Gamma Delta
Residential buildings on the National Register of Historic Places in Minnesota
University of Minnesota